Youghal is a townland in the Barony of Owney and Arra,  County Tipperary, Ireland.
It is located in the civil parish of Youghalarra.

References

Townlands of County Tipperary